Kanshi Ram (15 March 1934 – 9 October 2006), also known as Bahujan Nayak or Manyavar or Saheb, was an Indian politician and social reformer who worked for the upliftment and political mobilisation of the Bahujans, the backward or lower caste people including untouchable groups at the bottom of the caste system in India. Towards this end, Kanshi Ram founded Dalit Shoshit Samaj Sangharsh Samiti (DS-4), the All India Backward (SC, ST, OBC..) and Minorities Communities Employees' Federation (BAMCEF) in 1971 and the Bahujan Samaj Party (BSP) in 1984. He ceded leadership of the BSP to his protégé Mayawati who has served four terms as Chief Minister of Uttar Pradesh.

Early life
Kanshi Ram was born to a Ramdasia family of Chamar caste on 15 March 1934 in Ropar district, Punjab, British India. Some sources say his birthplace was the village of Pirthipur Bunga and others that it was Khawaspur village.

After studies at various local schools, Ram graduated in 1956 with a BSc degree from Government College Ropar.

Career
Kanshi Ram joined the offices of the Explosive Research and Development Laboratory in Pune. It was at this time that he first experienced caste discrimination and in 1964 he became an activist. Those who admire him point out that he was spurred to this after reading B. R. Ambedkar's book Annihilation of Caste and witnessing the discrimination against a Dalit employee who wished to observe a holiday celebrating Ambedkar's birth. Kanshi Ram strongly inspired by B. R. Ambedkar and his philosophy.

Ram initially supported the Republican Party of India (RPI) but became disillusioned with its co-operation with the Indian National Congress. In 1971, he founded the All India SC, ST, OBC and Minority Employees Association and in 1978 this became BAMCEF, an organisation that aimed to persuade educated members of the Scheduled Castes, Scheduled Tribes, Other Backwards Classes and Minorities to support Ambedkarite principles. BAMCEF was neither a political nor a religious body and it also had no aims to agitate for its purpose. Suryakant Waghmore says it appealed to "the class among the Dalits that was comparatively well-off, mostly based in urban areas and small towns working as government servants and partially alienated from their untouchable identities".

Later, in 1981, Ram formed another social organisation known as Dalit Shoshit Samaj Sangharsh Samiti (DSSSS, or DS4). He started his attempt of consolidating the Dalit vote and in 1984 he founded the Bahujan Samaj Party (BSP). He fought his first election in 1984 from Janjgir-Champa seat in Chhattisgarh. The BSP found success in Uttar Pradesh, initially struggled to bridge the divide between Dalits and Other Backward Classes but later under leadership of Mayawati bridged this gap.

In 1982 he wrote his book The Chamcha Age, in which he used the term chamcha (stooge) to describe Dalit leaders such as Jagjivan Ram and Ram Vilas Paswan. He argued that Dalits should work politically for their own ends rather than compromise by working with other parties.

After forming BSP Ram said the party would fight first election to lose, next to get noticed and the third election to win. In 1988 he contested Allahabad seat up against a future Prime Minister V. P. Singh and performed impressively but lost polling close to 70,000 votes.

He unsuccessfully contested from East Delhi (Lok Sabha constituency) (against HKL Bhagat) and Amethi (Lok Sabha constituency) (against Rajiv Gandhi) in 1989 and came in the third position on both the seats. Then he represented the 11th Lok Sabha (1996-1998) from Hoshiarpur, Kanshiram was also elected as member of Lok Sabha from Etawah in Uttar Pradesh.

After Demolition of the Babri Masjid in 1992, Mulayam Singh Yadav and Kanshi Ram joined hands to keep communal forces out of power by creating unity among the backward and Dalit castes and giving the popular slogan "Mile Mulayam-Kanshi Ram, Hawa mein ud gaye Jai Shri Ram". After the election, a coalition government of Samajwadi Party and Bahujan Samaj Party was formed in UP under the leadership of Mulayam Singh Yadav, although due to some differences and Mayawati's ambition, this alliance broke up in June 1995, Mayawati became first time Chief Minister of Uttar Pradesh in support of BJP. In the late 1990s, Ram described the BJP as the most corrupt (mahabrasht) party in India and the Indian National Congress INC, Samajwadi Party and Janata Dal as equally corrupt. In 2001 He declared Mayawati as his successor.

Proposed conversion to Buddhism
In 2002, Ram announced his intention to convert to Buddhism on 14 October 2006, the 50th anniversary of Ambedkar's conversion. He intended for 50,000,000 of his supporters to convert at the same time. Part of the significance of this plan was that Ram's followers include not only untouchables, but persons from a variety of castes, who could significantly broaden Buddhism's support. However, he died on 9 October 2006.

Mayawati his successor said "Saheb Kanshi Ram and I had decided that we will convert and adopt Buddhism when we will get "absolute majority" at the centre. We wanted to do this because we can make a difference to the religion by taking along with us millions of people. If we convert without power then only we two will be converting. But when you have power you can really create a stir".

Death
Kanshi Ram was a diabetic. He suffered a heart attack in 1994, an arterial clot in his brain in 1995, and a paralytic stroke in 2003. He died in New Delhi on 9 October 2006 of a severe heart attack at the age of 72. He had been virtually bed-ridden for more than two years. According to his wishes, his funeral rites were performed according to Buddhist tradition, with Mayawati lighting the pyre. His ashes were placed in an urn and kept at Prerna Sthal, where many people paid their respects.

In his condolence message, Indian Prime Minister Manmohan Singh described Ram as "one of the greatest social reformers of our time.. his political ideas and movements had a significant impact on our political evolution... He had a larger understanding of social change and was able to unite various underprivileged sections of our society and provide a political platform where their voices would be heard." Under Ram's leadership, the BSP won 14 parliamentary seats in the 1999 parliamentary elections.

Books
In 1982, Kanshi Ram wrote The Chamcha Age (The Era of the Stooges), a book in which he used the term chamcha (stooge) for Dalit leaders who he alleged had selfish reasons to work for parties such as the Indian National Congress (INC) and Bharatiya Janata Party (BJP). His book Birth of BAMCEF was also published. His biography, Kanshiram: Leader of the Dalits was written by Badri Narayan Tiwari. His speeches are compiled in books like Bahujan Nayak Kanshiram Ke Avismarniya Bhashan by Anuj Kumar, Writings & Speeches of Kanshiram compiled by S. S. Gautam & A.R. Akela and The Editorials of Kanshi Ram by Bahujan Samaj Publications in 1997.

Legacy

There are many government programmes and schemes and public institutions named after Kanshi Ram in Uttar Pradesh. His birthplace Pirthipur Bunga Sahib has a memorial with his statue. Manyawar Shri Kanshiram Ji Green Eco Garden in Lucknow has been named in his memory.

Biopic
 In 2017, a Hindi-language Biopic film The Great Leader Kanshiram was released in India, directed and produced by Arjun Singh, based on the story of DS4, BAMCEF and Bahujan Samaj Party founder Kanshi Ram from his childhood to 1984.

References

External links
 Profile on Parliament of India
 Shri Kanshi Ram 
 Profile on Bahujan Samaj Party website

Dalit politicians
India MPs 1996–1997
1934 births
2006 deaths
Indian socialists
Indian Buddhists
Converts to Buddhism
Converts to Buddhism from Sikhism
Bahujan Samaj Party politicians
People from Hoshiarpur
Indian political party founders
Lok Sabha members from Punjab, India
Lok Sabha members from Uttar Pradesh
Indian social reformers
Former Sikhs
People from Rupnagar district
India MPs 1991–1996
People from Etawah district